Agrovation may refer to:

 Aggravation (disambiguation)
 Agro Vation, the putative full name of Agro (puppet), Australian puppet and media personality